Yuryevo is a rural locality (a village) in Leskovskoye Rural Settlement, Vologodsky District, Vologda Oblast, Russia. The population was 11 as of 2002.

Geography 
Yuryevo is located 18 km west of Vologda (the district's administrative centre) by road. Otradnoye is the nearest rural locality.

References 

Rural localities in Vologodsky District